Kohuwala is a suburb in Colombo, Sri Lanka and is situated where the Colombo Piliyandala Road crosses Nugegoda Dehiwala Road. Hence it is connected to Nugegoda, Dehiwala, Pamankada, Boralesgamuwa and Piliyandala. Kohuwala is inside the administration boundary of Dehiwala-Mount Lavinia Municipal Council.

Schools and universities  
 University of Dancing and Performing Arts
 Lyceum International School 
 Colombo South International College

References

Populated places in Western Province, Sri Lanka